Obsolete badges of the United States military are a number of U.S. military insignia which were issued in the 20th and 21st centuries.  After World War II many badges were phased out of the United States Armed Forces in favor of more modern military badges which are used today.

A unique obsolete badge situation occurred with General of the Air Force Henry H. Arnold, who in 1913 was among the 24 Army pilots to receive the first Military Aviator Badge, an eagle bearing Signal Corps flags suspended from a bar.  Replaced in 1917 by the more conventional "wings" embroidered design (authorized as an oxidized silver badge in 1921), Arnold displayed both types on his uniform throughout his career. The original Military Aviator Badge design can be seen in pictures of him in uniform.

The following is a listing of obsolete U.S. military badges and insignia organized by branch of service.

U.S. Army

Army Aviation Section/Air Service

Army Air Forces

Regular Army

U.S. Air Force

U.S. Marine Corps

U.S. Coast Guard

U.S. Navy

Joint Service Badges

See also
 Obsolete military awards of the United States
 United States Army branch insignia#Obsolete insignia
 List of United States Coast Guard ratings#Obsolete ratings (1990–present)
 List of United States Navy ratings#Discontinued and changed ratings (1972–present)
 Military badges of the United States
 Uniformed services of the United States

References 

United States military badges